Alex Township is a township in McKenzie County, North Dakota. The population is 58.

References

*Obtained from the Spanish Wikipedia.

Townships in North Dakota